Steel Chariots is a 1997 American made-for-television sports film about NASCAR that was produced for Touchstone Television. It first aired on the Fox Network on September 23, 1997.

Cast
 John Beck as Dale Tucker
 Kathleen Nolan as Ethyl Tucker
 Ben Browder as D.J. Tucker
 Heidi Mark as Amber
 Randy Travis as Rev. Wally Jones
 Scott Gurney as Brett Tucker
 Madison Michele as Melissa Bogart
 Brian Van Holt as Franklin Jones
 Heather Stephens as Josie
 Robby Pretty as Charlotte Tucker
 Jordan Williams as Glenn Walton
 Dan Albright as Rory Bass
 Craig Hauer as Trey Tucker
 Chuck Kinlaw as Willard
 Darryl Van Leer as Nate
 Andy Stahl as Crew Chiel
 R. Keith Harris as Jerry
 Cress Horne as Helicopter Pilot

Production
Filming took place in Birmingham, Alabama, Charlotte, North Carolina, Concord, North Carolina, and Dallas, Texas. Filming was also done at Talladega Superspeedway.

References

External links

1997 television films
1997 films
American auto racing films
Fox network original films
1990s sports films
Films directed by Tommy Lee Wallace
1990s American films